{{DISPLAYTITLE:C4H9N3O2}}
The molecular formula C4H9N3O2 (molar mass: 131.13 g/mol) may refer to:

 Creatine
 Guanidinopropionic acid

Molecular formulas